Airboy is a fictional aviator hero of an American comic book series initially published by Hillman Periodicals during the World War II-era time period fans and historians call the Golden Age of comic books. He was created by writers Charles Biro and Dick Wood and artist Al Camy.

The character disappeared from publications until a 1980s revival under Chuck Dixon that lasted for several years. He has appeared intermittently since then under multiple publishers, sometimes updating his story to the present day.

Publication history

Golden Age
Airboy debuted in Air Fighters Comics #2 (cover-date Nov. 1942), an anthology series featuring a variety of aviator heroes. The series was renamed Airboy Comics with the twenty-third issue, vol. 2, #11 (Dec. 1945), and ran 89 issues, through vol. 10, #4 (May 1953).

In the early issues, Biro wrote the scripts with Dave Wood and drew the covers, Al Camy was the initial story artist. He was followed by Tony DiPreta and, beginning with Air Fighters #10 (July 1943), Fred Kida, who would become closely associated with the series. Ernie Schroeder became the regular artist with Airboy Comics #vol. 5, #11 (Dec. 1948), through the end of the series' run, with Dan Barry, Maurice Del Bourgo, Carmine Infantino, and others supplying an occasional story. The two consecutive series contained backup stories about other aviators, including Skywolf, Iron Ace, the Black Angel, the Bald Eagle, the Flying Dutchman, the Flying Fool, and the prototypical comic book swamp monster, the Heap. Airboy's most frequently recurring supporting character was the German aviator Valkyrie, who fought on the side of the Axis but then defected to the Allies.

Hillman stopped publishing comics in 1953. Two issues were reprinted in 1973 and a trade paperback entitled Valkyrie!: From the Pages of Air Fighters and the Airboy was published in 1982 by Ken Pierce Books with five stories from Air Fighters Comics vol. 2, #s 2 and 7 and Airboy Comics vol. 2, #12, and vol. 3 #s 6 and 12.

Modern era
In 1986, Eclipse Comics published a new Airboy series, updated to the modern era, starring the son of the original character. The 50-issue comic (July 15, 1986 – October 1989), which ran as a half-sized (16-page) bi-weekly through issue #33 (November 1, 1987) and monthly thereafter, reintroduced many of the supporting characters from the old series, such as Valkyrie and a Japanese fighter pilot named Hirota, and guest-starred many of the characters who had appeared as backups in the original comics. Chuck Dixon scripted with the occasional assistance of Tim Truman, with Truman, Ron Randall and Stan Woch the main illustrators.

Spin-offs from the Eclipse series include the one-shots Airboy–Mr. Monster Special (Aug. 1987), Airboy Meets the Prowler (Dec. 1987), The Air Fighters Meet Sgt. Strike Special (Jan. 1988), Target: Airboy (March 1988), and Airboy vs. the Air Maidens (July 1988). Additional spinoffs starred related characters: Air Maidens Special (Aug. 1987), starring Black Angel, La Lupina, and Valkyrie; the miniseries Skywolf #1–3 (March–Oct. 1988); and two Valkyrie comics, the one-shot Valkyrie: Prisoner of the Past (Dec. 1987), drawn by Paul Gulacy, and the three-issue miniseries Valkyrie! (July–Sept. 1988), penciled by Brent Anderson. In addition, the Air Fighters co-starred in the five-issue miniseries Total Eclipse (May 1988 – April 1989), which featured most of the Eclipse stars together, and the one-shot Total Eclipse: The Seraphim Objective (Nov. 1988). Prisoner of the Past was collected as a trade paperback, as were Airboy #1–5 entitled The Return of Valkyrie. Prisoner of the Past was also published in a hardcover edition.

Starting in 1988, Eclipse also published Air Fighters Classics, a six issue bimonthly series dedicated to reprinting the original Golden Age stories of Airboy and related characters.

In 2007, Moonstone Books announced plans to revive the World War II character in new stories written by 1980s Airboy writer Dixon. However, the revival did not see print until March 2009, when Moonstone released the one-shot Airboy – 1942: Best of Enemies. Two issues of Airfighters, featuring Airboy, followed in 2010.

The Valkyrie character was ranked 45th in Comics Buyer's Guide's "100 Sexiest Women in Comics" list.

In 2012, Antarctic Press started publishing Airboy: Deadeye by Chuck Dixon, Gianluca Piredda and Ben Dunn.

In 2014, Image Comics began publishing a new Airboy comic, written by James Robinson and illustrated by Greg Hinkle. This series begins with fictionalised versions of Robinson and Hinkle engaging in an orgy of drink, drugs and sex while trying to find the inspiration to write a new Airboy series, only for the "real" Airboy to enter their world, much to his horror.

Fictional character biography
The first Airboy was David ("Davy") Nelson II, the son of an expert pilot and, despite his youth, a crack flyer himself. His friend, inventor and Franciscan friar Brother Francis Martier, had created a highly maneuverable prototype aircraft that flew by flapping its wings, like a bird. Martier, however, was killed while testing it, and Davy inherited both the plane and a uniform, which had apparently been in Martier's family since the French Revolution. Davy soon christened himself "Airboy", and in his seemingly sentient new plane, "Birdie", helped the Allies during World War II.

Airboy confronted such weird antagonists as intelligent rats, the mysterious Misery – whose Airtomb imprisoned the souls of dead pilots – and his cleavage-baring Nazi nemesis, Valkyrie, a German aviator who later became his ally. He also contended with a recurring villain, the occultist Zzed.

After the conclusion of World War II, David Nelson II continued to work as a freelance pilot and mercenary for a time, but he eventually retired from combat flying and stored Birdie in a barn outside his California estate. He had a son, whom he named David Nelson III, and founded an aircraft manufacturing company, through which he became very wealthy. In the mid-1980s, David Nelson II was assassinated by mercenaries from the South American nation of Bogantilla. When David Nelson III discovered that his father had been assassinated, he began to investigate the circumstances which had led up to his father's death. He soon discovered his father's mothballed plane and uniform and teamed up with a number of the surviving Air Fighters to face many of the same enemies as David Nelson II, as well as South American dictators, Soviets, pirates and corporate criminals.

Homages
The first volume in the Wild Cards novel series edited by George R.R. Martin includes a character called Jetboy, an Airboy analogue created by Howard Waldrop who wanted to write an Airboy story.

The lead character of publisher America's Best Comics' graphic novel Top 10: The Forty-Niners is Jetlad, whom historian Jess Nevins calls, "an analogue of Charles Biro's teenaged aviator Airboy".

Collected editions

Antarctic Press
Airboy: Deadeye collects Airboy: Deadeye #1–5, Softcover: 128 pages, Publisher: Antarctic Press, October 2013,

Eclipse Comics
Almost the entirety of Eclipse's Airboy content has been republished by IDW:
Airboy Archives Volume 1 collects Airboy #1–16, Softcover: 312 pages, Publisher: IDW, March 2014, 
Airboy Archives Volume 2 collects Airboy #17–25, Valkyrie #1–3 (1987), Softcover: 300 pages, Publisher: IDW, September 2014, 
Airboy Archives Volume 3 collects Airboy #26–34, Airmaidens Special, Airboy–Mr. Monster Special, Airboy Meets The Prowler, Softcover: 316 pages, Publisher: IDW, March 2015, 
Airboy Archives Volume 4 collects Airboy #35–40, Airfighters Meet Sgt. Strike, Skywolf #1–3, Softcover: 292 pages, Publisher: IDW, April 2016, 
Airboy Archives Volume 5 collects Airboy #41–50, Valkyrie #1–3 (1988), Airboy vs. The Air Maidens, plus a previously unpublished eight-page Skywolf story, Softcover: 380 pages, Publisher: IDW, April 2017, 

Additionally, the one-shot Target: Airboy has gone uncollected and the character appeared alongside all of Eclipse's properties in the Total Eclipse crossover event.

Canton Street Press
The Complete Golden Age Airboy & Valkyrie collects Air Fighters #12; vol. 2. #2, #7; Airboy vol. 2, #12; vol. 3, #6, #12; vol. 4, #10; vol. 9, #2, Softcover: 136 pages, Publisher: Canton Street Press, September 2013,

Image Comics
Airboy Deluxe Edition collects Airboy #1–4, Hardcover: 120 pages, Publisher: Image, April 2016,

Moonstone Comics
Airboy and the Airfighters: Dangerous Liaisons collects Airboy: 1942, Airfighters #1, Air Fighters #2, Air Vixens, plus the never-before-published Airfighters: L'Hospital St. Blaise, Softcover: 256 pages, Publisher: Moonstone, January 2013,

Reception
Martin A. Stever reviewed Airboy in Space Gamer/Fantasy Gamer No. 83. Stever commented that "the key to this book's success has been the balance Dixon has stuck between adventure, humor, mystery, and romance. This, along with break-neck pacing and plenty of action in every issue have made Airboy a monthly even I look forward to".

Footnotes

References
 Airboy at Don Markstein's Toonopedia. Archived from the original on March 15, 2012.
 Airboy at An International Catalogue of Superheroes. 

Golden Age superheroes
1942 comics debuts
American comics characters
Antarctic Press titles
Aviation comics
Child superheroes
Eclipse Comics characters
Eclipse Comics titles
Fictional aviators
Image Comics characters
Image Comics titles